Parramatta ferry wharf is located near the source of the Parramatta River, serving the Sydney satellite city of Parramatta.

History
There has been a wharf at Parramatta since shortly after a settlement was established. The wharf is located next to the Queens' Wharf Reserve and the Gasworks Bridge, which was close to the site of the first official landing place at Parramatta, when Governor Phillip and a small number of marines arrived in 1788 to establish a second settlement. The first steam ferry to operate between Sydney and Parramatta was named Surprise, beginning service on 2 June 1831. The original wharf was built by convicts from gum tree logs, and reconstructed in sandstone in 1835. Paddle steamers would come up the river with their goods and their passengers from Sydney Cove.

From October 1883, a steam tramway connected the wharf at Redbank, near where Duck River meets the Parramatta River, with the town, extending along George Street to Park Gates. The tramway closed on 31 March 1943. The trams conveyed both passengers and goods, serving a number of industries from sidings off the main line.

Due to silting and pollution of the river, Sydney Ferries Limited services west of Meadowbank ceased in 1928. In December 1993, the State Transit Authority resumed services to Parramatta.

Today Parramatta wharf is served by Sydney Ferries Parramatta River services operating to and from Circular Quay. The single wharf is served by RiverCat class ferries. During periods of low tide, services terminate at Rydalmere with passengers completing the final part of the journey by bus.

Wharves & services

Interchanges
Parramatta wharf is served by the Parramatta Loop bus service.

References

External links

 Parramatta Wharf at Transport for New South Wales (Archived 13 June 2019)
Parramatta Wharf Local Area Map Transport for NSW

Ferry wharves in Sydney
Parramatta River